KAB-500 is a Russian precision guided weapon which comes in four versions: 

KAB-500KR TV-guided bomb
KAB-500L laser-guided bomb 
KAB-500OD EO correlation TV seeker
KAB-500S-E satellite-guided bomb

References

Guided bombs
Aerial bombs of Russia